Migration is an album by American pianist Dave Grusin released in 1989, recorded for the GRP label. The album reached No. 1 on Billboard's Contemporary Jazz chart.

"The Suite from the Milagro Beanfield War" (tracks 10–14) received the 1990 Grammy Award for Best Arrangement of an Instrumental. Grusin's music from the movie The Milagro Beanfield War was also a 1989 Academy Award winner, and a 1988 Golden Globe nominee for Best Original Score.

Track listing
All tracks composed by Dave Grusin; except where indicated
"Punta Del Soul" – 5:51
"Southwest Passage" – 5:49
"First Time Love" (Harvey Mason, Dave Grusin) – 4:05
"Western Women" (Don Grusin) – 4:58
"Dancing in the Township" – 6:06
"Old Bones" – 6:15
"In the Middle of the Night" – 5:52
"T.K.O." (Marcus Miller) – 5:47
"Polina" (Hugh Masekela) – 6:55
Suite from the Milagro Beanfield War:
"Lupita" – 1:08
"Coyote Angel" – 3:29
"Pistolero" – 1:47
"Milagro" – 2:35
"Fiesta" – 2:24

Personnel
 Dave Grusin – Fender Rhodes electric piano, piano, synthesizer, percussion, conductor
 Branford Marsalis – saxophone
 Hugh Masekela – flugelhorn
 Carlos Rios – guitar
 Abraham Laboriel – bass
 Marcus Miller – bass
 Omar Hakim – drums
 Harvey Mason – drums
 Mike Fisher – percussion

Charts

References

External links
Dave Grusin-Migration at Discogs
Dave Grusin-Migration at AllMusic

1989 albums
GRP Records albums
Dave Grusin albums